Dorguth Memorial United Methodist Church, formerly known as Otterbein Chapel Station, Scott Street United Brethren Church, Dorguth Memorial United Brethren Church, and Dorguth Memorial Evangelical United Brethren Church, is a historic United Methodist church located at Baltimore, Maryland, United States. It was built in 1857 and is a simple, two-story gable-front brick church of the late Roman Revival style. It features a gabled roof with a pedimented brick cornice.  Also on the property is the parish house added in 1868.> The church was named for Mrs. Frederick Dorguth, who in 1936 left money for extensive renovations. Dorguth UMC closed its doors in 2001.

Dorguth Memorial United Methodist Church was listed on the National Register of Historic Places in 1979.

References

External links
, including photo from 1977, at Maryland Historical Trust

Churches in Baltimore
Otterbein, Baltimore
United Methodist churches in Maryland
Properties of religious function on the National Register of Historic Places in Baltimore
Churches completed in 1857
19th-century Methodist church buildings in the United States
Churches on the National Register of Historic Places in Maryland
1857 establishments in Maryland